The autostrada A50 is a planned motorway in Poland, in Masovian Voivodeship. It will run as a circular road south of the Warsaw metropolitan area to take over the transit traffic from the existing expressway ring around the city, mainly from the S2 expressway. Once built, the motorway bypass will also be one of the road connectors to the planned Solidarity Transport Hub. It was added to the motorway and expressway index by Polish government on 24 September 2019. Expected completion of the road, along with parallel S50 expressway is set on 2027.

See also 
 National road 50 (Poland)

References 

Motorways in Poland
Proposed roads in Poland